Interlochen Center for the Arts (also known as I.C.A. or Inty) is a non-profit corporation which operates arts education institutions and performance venues. Established in 1928 by Joseph E. Maddy, Interlochen Center for the Arts is located on a  campus in Green Lake Township, Grand Traverse County, Michigan, near the eponymous community of Interlochen.

History

Early settlement 
Before the arrival of European settlers to Northwest Michigan, members of the Odawa people lived between the lakes they called Wahbekaness and Wahbekanetta (now named Duck Lake and Green Lake, respectively). Beginning in the late 19th century, European settlers began logging and fishing industries in the area, and founded the small village of Wylie, one mile south the of present-day community of Interlochen. Due to the prospering logging industry in the area, the Manistee and North-Eastern Railroad (owned by the Buckley and Douglas Lumber Company of Manistee) extended its line northeast from Nessen City and arrived between the lakes in the fall of 1889. Similarly, the Chicago and West Michigan Railway extended its line north from Baldwin on its way to Traverse City in 1890. The two lines crossed in current-day downtown Interlochen where a depot and interlocking tower were located. 

Interlochen State Park, immediately adjacent campus, is the first state park organized by the state of Michigan, established in 1917 and opening in 1919 (Mackinac Island was originally a national park before becoming Michigan's first state park in 1895).

School history 
In the 1920s, the Music Supervisors National Conference called upon conductor and educator Joseph E. Maddy to assemble talented high school musicians from around the United States to form the National High School Orchestra. The orchestra met in 1926 in Detroit, and the orchestra was asked to reconvene in 1927 and 1928.

In 1927, Maddy and fellow music educator Thaddeus P. Giddings incorporated the National High School Orchestra Camp, and began searching for ideal locations, eventually narrowing down to sites in Maine and Michigan. Maddy was invited by Interlochen businessman Willis Pennington to tour his hotel and summer camp properties, adjacent to Interlochen State Park (Camp Interlochen and Camp Penn Loch, for boys and girls, respectively). Maddy chose the site, and, in 1928, the first season of the National High School Orchestra Camp convened.

In 1944, Maddy purchased Camps Interlochen and Penn Loch, absorbing them and the National High School Orchestra Camp into his new Interlochen Center for the Arts.

In 1963, WIAA, Interlochen's public radio station, signed on for the first time.  Originally broadcasting eight hours per day, it grew enough within a decade to become a charter member of National Public Radio. Interlochen Public Radio became a network in 1989 with the addition of WICV. Interlochen bought contemporary Christian station WDQV in 2005 and converted it into a third satellite for the eastern portion of the market, WIAB.

Recent history 
In 2006, Katalyst Media filmed a reality TV pilot for MTV at Interlochen Arts Academy. Afraid that an MTV show would ruin Interlochen's distinguished reputation, a large group of students resorted to protesting and trolling the Katalyst Media film crew in order to prevent Katalyst Media from filming viable footage. Student efforts were successful, however a pilot never aired.

In 2020, M-137, the highway connecting Interlochen Center for the Arts to US 31, was decommissioned by the Michigan Department of Transportation. Upon the roadway's handover to the Grand Traverse County Road Commission, the roadway was renamed to the "J. Maddy Parkway", after the institution's founder.

Programs
Interlochen Center for the Arts is the umbrella organization for summer program Interlochen Arts Camp, arts boarding high school Interlochen Arts Academy, National Public Radio (NPR) charter station Interlochen Public Radio, performance series Interlochen Presents, adult arts program Interlochen College of Creative Arts, and online arts program Interlochen Online.

Interlochen Arts Camp 
The Interlochen Arts Camp is the original educational institution created by Joseph E. Maddy.

Interlochen Arts Academy
Interlochen Arts Academy is a pre-professional arts boarding high school, founded in 1928 by Joseph E. Maddy. The school offers seven arts majors in creative writing, dance, film and new media, interdisciplinary arts, music, theater, and visual arts.

Ninety-six percent of graduates are accepted into one of their top three colleges. The 2021 graduating class matriculated to various institutions, including: Berklee College of Music, Boston Conservatory at Berklee, Eastman School of Music, Jacobs School of Music, Juilliard School, New York University, Northwestern University, Princeton University, Stanford University, University of Southern California, and Yale University.

Interlochen Online 
Interlochen Online began during the COVID-19 pandemic and is now a main educational pillar for the institution. The program offers private lessons and group courses in all seven of Interlochen's arts area: Creative Writing, Dance, Film & New Media, Interdisciplinary Arts, Music, Theatre, and Visual Arts. Plus, Interlochen Online offers private, college advising to those interested in pursuing conservatory or arts-focused higher education.

Interlochen College of Creative Arts 
Founded in 2004, Interlochen College of Creative Arts offers non-degree granting arts programs and continuing education units for adults 18 years and older.

Interlochen Public Radio 

Interlochen Center for the Arts is home to Interlochen Public Radio (or IPR), a National Public Radio member station that broadcasts a signal to most of the lower peninsula of Northern Michigan as well as parts of eastern Wisconsin. Two listener-supported stations broadcast to northwest Michigan: Classical Music 88.7, 88.5, 94.7 and 100.9 FM; News Radio 91.5, 90.1 and 89.7 FM. Broadcasts include arts programming, news and culture from around the world, as well as local and regional news. IPR was a charter member of National Public Radio.

Founded in 1963, Interlochen Public Radio or WIAA was envisioned as an extension of the "Music From Interlochen" program which ran on the NBC radio network. The Music From Interlochen Program informed a wider audience about the activities at the then-named National Music Camp and the nascent Interlochen Arts Academy. The station was slow to catch on in its early years and some considered shutting down the operation. Interlochen Public Radio went on to establish itself with two service channels: one for music and one for news.

In 1993, Interlochen Public Radio reportedly had one of the highest rates of per capita contributions of any public radio station in the United States. The station's classical music service is broadcast from their main tower at WIAA 88.7 FM in Interlochen, along with WIAB 88.5 FM in Mackinaw City, and W234BU 94.7 FM in Traverse City. In 2000, IPR began offering a separate news service on WICA 91.5 FM in Traverse City and later added WLMN 89.7 FM in Manistee and WHBP 90.1 FM in Harbor Springs.

Interlochen Presents
Interlochen Presents offers a summer festival from June through August during the arts camp and a performing arts series from September through May that coincides with the Arts Academy school year. It features concerts, plays, art exhibits, readings, film screenings, and dance productions presented by students, faculty, and staff, along with an assortment of guest artists. Previous guest artists include Steely Dan, Sheryl Crow, Willie Nelson, Joshua Bell, Jason Mraz, Bonnie Raitt, Olga Kern, Sara Bareilles, Dierks Bentley, Norah Jones, Martha Graham Dance Company, Ra Ra Riot, Bob Dylan, Jewel, Carol Jantsch, Josh Groban, Paula Poundstone, Nathan Gunn, Chris Thile, and Bela Fleck.

Awards and accolades 
National Medal of Arts: In 2006, Interlochen Center for the Arts was named recipient of the National Medal of Arts, one of the highest honors bestowed by the President of the United States and National Endowment for the Arts on individuals or institutions that have contributed substantially to the growth and advancement of the arts. Interlochen president emeritus Jeffrey Kimpton received the award on behalf of Interlochen Center for the Arts from President George W. Bush in an Oval Office ceremony.
Presidential Scholars in the Arts: Interlochen Arts Academy is a perennial front-runner among American high schools in its production of Presidential Scholars in the Arts, having produced more recipients of the award than any other school in the nation.

Gallery

Notable alumni

Notable alumni include:

 Maude Apatow - actress
 Michael Arden - singer, actor, and director 
 Michael Arrom - musician
 Meredith Baxter - actress
 Vince Gilligan - producer and screenwriter
 Charles Roland Berry - composer
 Garrett Børns - musician
 Chris Brubeck - musician
 David Burtka - actor and chef
 Bruno Campos - actor
 Rachel Carns - musician
 Charlie Carver - actor
 Angelin Chang - pianist
 Victoria Clark - singer and actress
 Kat Coiro - writer and director
 Larry Combs - Principal clarinetist, Chicago Symphony Orchestra (Ret.)
 Frank Crawford - Principal Tuba, “The President’s Own” United States Marine Band
 Terry Crews - actor and pro football player
 John Dalley - violinist
 Chip Davis - musician
 Xavier Davis - musician
 Michael Delp - writer
 Elaine Douvas - musician
 Kermit Driscoll - musician
 Aaron Dworkin - Dean of the University of Michigan School of Music, Theatre & Dance
 Doriot Anthony Dwyer
 Jennifer Ehle - actress
 Peter Erskine - drummer
 Tovah Feldshuh - actress
 Anna Fidler - artist
 Barrett Foa - actor
 Ben Foster - actor
 Shelley Gillen - producer, screenwriter and songwriter
 Kimiko Glenn - actress and singer
 Steven M. Goodman - biologist
 Josh Groban - singer/songwriter & record producer with record sales over 35 million
 Keitaro Harada - conductor
 Steve Hayden - advertising executive
 Bob Havens - Musician
 Christie Hefner - publishing executive
 Marcy Heisler - lyricist
 Ed Helms - actor
 Evan Helmuth
 Jerry Hey - musician
 Anne Hills - singer/songwriter
 Wataru Hokoyama - composer and conductor
 Mary Holland - actress
 Marya Hornbacher - author
 Hao Huang - pianist
 Felicity Huffman - actress
 Tom Hulce - Oscar-nominated actor
 Linda Hunt - Oscar-winning actress
 Mary Hollis Inboden - actress
 Carol Jantsch - Principal tuba, Philadelphia Orchestra
 Aaron M. Johnson - saxophonist and bandleader
 Richard Joiner - clarinetist
 Scott Joiner - singer / composer
 Norah Jones - multiple Grammy Award-winning singer/songwriter.
 Kim Kashkashian - violist
 Ani Kavafian - violinist
 Ida Kavafian - violinist
 Celia Keenan-Bolger - actress
 Jewel Kilcher - singer
 Amelia Kinkade - actress
 Damian Kulash - musician - founding member of rock band OK Go
 Dane Laffrey - scenic designer
 Naomi Lang - ice dancer
 Phill Lewis - actor
 Jennifer Chambers Lynch - director
 Lorin Maazel - violinist, composer
 Anthony McGill - clarinetist
 Michael McMillian - actor
 Dmitri Matheny - musician
 Herman Matthews - drummer
 Mia Michaels - choreographer
 Eric Millegan - actor
 F. Hudson Miller - sound editor
 Bob Mintzer
 Ross Mintzer
 Elizabeth Fischer Monastero
 Dermot Mulroney - actor
 Jessye Norman - opera singer and Grammy Lifetime Achievement award winner
 Sean Osborn - Clarinetist and Composer
 Our Lady J - television writer, pianist, singer/songwriter
 Larry Page - co-founder of Google
 Elizabeth Parcells - Coloratura soprano
 Donovan Patton
 Shelley Posen
 Susan Poser - President of Hofstra University
 John Quale
 Rain Pryor - actress
 Anthony Rapp - Broadway actor
 Jackson Rathbone
 Margot Rose
 David Shifrin
 Trish Sie
 Alexandra Silber
 Peter Sparling
 Doug Stanton - New York Times bestselling author
 Sufjan Stevens - singer/songwriter and Academy Award and Grammy Award nominee
 Casey Stratton
 Toni Trucks
 Rufus Wainwright - Juno Award winning singer/songwriter
 Benjamin Walker
 Mike Wallace - television journalist
 Debbie Weems
 Michael Weiss
 Lawrence Irving Wilde - composer, singer, songwriter and producer of House of Faces
 Charley Wilkinson - timpanist
 Rumer Willis - actress
 Betty Who - Australian recording artist with top-ten single
 Peter Yarrow - singer
 Sean Young - actress

Further reading

References

External links
Official website
"I Found Myself at Band Camp" photo essay on the Interlochen Arts Camp, New York Times, 2021
The Association of Boarding Schools profile for the Interlochen Arts Academy

 Pine Nuts book website

Summer schools
Summer camps in Michigan
Art schools in Michigan
United States National Medal of Arts recipients
Educational institutions established in 1928
Music schools in Michigan
Boarding schools in Michigan
Schools in Grand Traverse County, Michigan
Education in Grand Traverse County, Michigan
Arts organizations established in 1928
1928 establishments in Michigan
Schools of the performing arts in the United States
Companies based in Grand Traverse County, Michigan